Meall Garbh is a mountain in the southern part of the Scottish Highlands. With Meall Greigh it forms the north-eastern end of the Ben Lawers range. Its craggy south face overlooks Lochan nan Cat.

The summit is not easily seen from the A827 road, from where the ascent is usually started. A path follows the Lawers Burn towards Lochan nan Cat. For a direct ascent of Meall Garbh the walker may simply climb Northeast from this path shortly after it passes some abandoned shielings. Alternatively, Meall Garbh is more commonly climbed in conjunction with Meall Greigh, with the latter hill being climbed first; the route described previously is thus used for descent. Meall Garbh could also form part of a longer traverse of the Ben Lawers Range, taking another four Munros, finishing at the National Trust for Scotland visitor centre. This route can be further extended to a total of seven Munros if one also climbs Meall a' Choire Léith and Meall Corranaich.

See also 
 Ben Nevis
 List of Munro mountains
 Mountains and hills of Scotland

References
 The Munros, SMC Hillwalkers Guide: Donald Bennett et al.: 

Munros
Marilyns of Scotland
Mountains and hills of the Southern Highlands
Mountains and hills of Perth and Kinross
One-thousanders of Scotland